The 2011 Division 1 was contested by 28 teams divided into two groups geographically. Umeå FC and Varbergs BoIS won their respective groups, and were thereby qualified for play in the 2012 Superettan.

League tables

North

South

Season statistics

Scoring

Stars of Tomorrow all-star game
At the end of each Division 1 season, the best young players from each group compete in an all-star game called "Morgondagens Stjärnor" (English: "Stars of Tomorrow").

References
Sweden - List of final tables (Clas Glenning)

Swedish Football Division 1 seasons
3
Sweden
Sweden